Stanhope is a town in north central Victoria, Australia.

History
The Post Office opened on 21 May 1917 but was known as Lauderdale until 1920.

Today
Like many towns in this area of Victoria, it relies heavily on its dairy production, and farming. A large dairy processing plant lies in the centre of the town.

Like much of Victoria, Netball and Australian rules football are extremely popular and Stanhope hosts a team which is part of the Kyabram & District Football League.

Services in the town include a general convenience store, a pub, lawn bowls and tennis courts.

Local landmarks include Lake Cooper and Loch Garry and other towns nearby include Girgarre and Tatura and Echuca.

Notable people
John McEwen, a.k.a. "Black Jack McEwen", 18th Prime Minister of Australia, was a dairy farmer in Stanhope before entering politics.

References

Towns in Victoria (Australia)